Fred Ewing Lewis (February 8, 1865 – June 27, 1949) was a Republican member of the U.S. House of Representatives from Pennsylvania.

Biography
Fred Ewing Lewis was born in Allentown, Pennsylvania on February 8, 1865. He attended the Collegiate and Commercial Institute in New Haven, Connecticut, and Muhlenberg College in Allentown. After studying law, he was admitted to the bar in 1888, and began the practice of his profession in Allentown.

He served as Mayor of Allentown in 1896 and 1902. He organized and was president of the Merchants’ National Bank and was president of the Dime Savings & Trust Co. in Allentown.

Lewis was elected as a Republican to the Sixty-third Congress. After his time in Congress, he resumed his profession and also engaged in banking. 

He then served again as mayor of Allentown from 1932 to 1936.

Death and interment
Lewis died in Allentown on June 27, 1949, and was interred in that city's Union-West End Cemetery.

References

1865 births
1949 deaths
Muhlenberg College alumni
Pennsylvania lawyers
Mayors of Allentown, Pennsylvania
Republican Party members of the United States House of Representatives from Pennsylvania